Gino Pagnani (born Luigi Pagnani Fusconi; 31 July 1927 – 10 April 2010) was an Italian actor and voice actor. He appeared in more than fifty films from 1968 to 1991.

Filmography

References

External links 

1927 births
2010 deaths
Italian male film actors
Italian male voice actors